The Democratic Party leadership election was held on 2 December 2018 for the 30-member 13th Central Committee of the Democratic Party in Hong Kong, including chairperson and two vice-chairperson posts.

Incumbent chairman Wu Chi-wai was re-elected uncontested with 189 confidence votes with incumbent vice-chairman Lo Kin-hei re-elected and former vice-chairman Andrew Wan retook the post from Li Wing-shing.

Electoral method
The Central Committee was elected by the party congress. All public office holders, including the members of the Legislative Council and District Councils, are eligible to vote in the party congress. The eligibility of members electing a delegate who holds one vote in the congress was 5 members. Candidate also needs a majority in order to claim victory.

Overview
Wu Chi-wai emphasised the average age of 42.8 year-old of the elected Central Committee, which was the youngest in history. Another highlight was former chairwoman Emily Lau running for the Disciplinary Committee, who was elected with relatively low votes of 153 votes.

Candidates

Chairperson
 Wu Chi-wai, incumbent chairman of the Democratic Party, Legislative Council member for Kowloon East and Wong Tai Sin District Councillor

Vice-Chairpersons
 Lo Kin-hei, incumbent Vice-Chairman of the Democratic Party and Southern District Councillor
 Andrew Wan, former Vice-Chairman of the Democratic Party and Legislative Council member for New Territories West

Elections

Results
The elected members of the 13th Central Committee are listed as following:
Chairman: Wu Chi-wai
Vice-Chairmen: Lo Kin-hei, Andrew Wan
Treasurer: Sin Chung-kai
Secretary: Cheung Yin-tung
Executive Committee Members:
 Chan Ying-kit
 Joseph Chow Kam-siu
 Joshua Fung Man-tao
 Leung Wing-kuen
 Mok Kin-shing
 Wong Ching-fung
 Yim Ka-wing
Central Committee Members:

 Chai Man-hon
 Wilfred Chong Wing-fai
 Chu Tsz-lok
 Lam Cheuk-ting
 Lee Wing-tat
 Leung Yik-ting
 Bonnie Ng Hoi-yan
 Stanley Ng Wing-fai
 Shum Wan-wah
 Sin Cheuk-lam
 So Yat-hang
 Tsang Chi-ming
 Tsoi Yiu-cheong
 Tsui Hon-kwong
 Wong Pik-wan
 Wu Chi-kin
 Yuen Hoi-man
 Josephine Chan Shu-ying

References

Democratic
Democratic Party (Hong Kong)
Political party leadership elections in Hong Kong
Democratic Party (HK) leadership election